Dimazole (or diamthazole) is an antifungal compound.

References

Dimethylamino compounds
Antifungals
Benzothiazoles
Ethers
Diethylamino compounds